The S139 (S for Solid, 139 for weight of 139 tonnes) is a Solid Rocket Booster manufactured by the Indian Space Research Organization at the Satish Dhawan Space Center in the SPROB facility. The rocket motor was first developed for use in the Polar Satellite Launch Vehicle. Later it was utilized in the GSLV MKII. It uses hydroxyl-terminated polybutadiene (HTPB) as a propellant. It has a maximum thrust of 4800 kN.

Associated rockets
The S139 Booster has been used in 2 major ISRO rockets.

It is used in the PSLV as its core stage since 1993.

It is also used as a core stage in Geosynchronous Satellite Launch Vehicle MKII rocket.

It is also the part of a variant of the Unified Launch Vehicle which is under development.

Gallery

References 

Rocket stages
Satish Dhawan Space Centre
Solid-fuel rockets
ISRO space launch vehicles
Expendable space launch systems
Polar Satellite Launch Vehicle
Geosynchronous Satellite Launch Vehicle